Steel casting is a specialized form of casting involving various types of steel cast to either final/net or near-net shape. Steel castings are used when iron castings cannot deliver enough strength or shock resistance.

Examples of items that are steel castings include: hydroelectric turbine wheels, forging presses, gears, railroad truck frames, valve bodies, pump casings, mining machinery, marine equipment, turbocharger turbines and engine cylinder blocks.

Steel castings are categorized into two general groups: carbon steels and alloy steels.

Steel castability 
Steel is more difficult to cast than iron. It has a higher melting point and greater shrinkage rate, which requires consideration during mold design. Risers should be given more capacity to draw from as the metal cools and shrinks. Attention should be paid to the thickness of mold cavities, as thinner areas will cool quicker than thicker areas, which can create internal stress points that can lead to fracture. 

Molten steel is also less fluid than molten iron, making it more difficult to pour and fill intricate gaps in a mold cavity. Molten steel is also more likely to react with internal mold surfaces, making for more unpredictable results.

Machinability 
Cast parts often require machining to achieve accurate tolerances and desired surface finishes. Carbon steel is the easiest type of steel to machine. High-carbon steel can be more time consuming to cut or grind, and will wear tools faster. Low-carbon steel can get gummy, making it difficult to work with. 

Generally, the presence of alloys used to increase mechanical performance often make machining more difficult.

Damping ability 
Casting is often a valuable means to creating intricate parts used in machine applications where vibration is often a factor. Cast steel typically has a lower damping ability than cast iron, which can lead to excess vibration and noise in the form of ringing or squealing.

Impact and wear resistance 
Most steels offer a good balance of strength and ductility, which makes them extremely tough. This allows them to withstand significant stress and strain without fracturing. Steel can also be fairly wear-resistant. Alloy additions can increase both impact and wear resistance.

Steel casting alloys

Alloy steel castings are broken down into two categories: low-alloy steels and high-alloy steels. Low-alloy steels contain less than 8% alloying content and high-alloy steels have 8% or more.

This is a table of some steel casting alloys:

Terminology
In present-day vocabulary, the term cast steel is almost always used in its sense referring to steel castings. Between the late 19th and mid 20th centuries, this was not always true, which is worth understanding if one is reading historical documents; see cast steel for details.

References

Notes

Bibliography
.

Casting (manufacturing)
Steel